UFC 91: Couture vs. Lesnar was a mixed martial arts event held by the Ultimate Fighting Championship (UFC) on November 15, 2008, at the MGM Grand Garden Arena in Las Vegas, Nevada.

Background
The main event featured the return of UFC Heavyweight Champion Randy Couture versus WWE's Brock Lesnar in a title bout.  The decision to grant Lesnar—who was 1–1 in UFC fights at the time—the title shot was controversial at the time. Some felt it was premature and marketing driven, while others argued the relative lack of depth in the heavyweight division at the time left no clear-cut contenders to the belt.

Matthew Riddle was forced to withdraw from his bout with Ryan Thomas due to an injury. He was replaced by Matt Brown.

Amir Sadollah withdrew from his fight against Nick Catone due to a leg infection.  A replacement for Sadollah could not be found, therefore the middleweight bout was pulled from the card.  A welterweight match between Dustin Hazelett and Tamdan McCrory, previously scheduled for the preliminary card, was moved to the main card.

Unlike most UFC fight cards, every bout was aired on the PPV broadcast due to the quick endings of the main card bouts.

Also future Lightweight champion Rafael dos Anjos made his UFC debut at this event.

Results

Bonus awards
Fighters were awarded $60,000 bonuses.

Fight of the Night: Aaron Riley vs. Jorge Gurgel
Knockout of the Night: Jeremy Stephens
Submission of the Night: Dustin Hazelett

Purses

The total payroll for the event was $1,118,000.

Brock Lesnar: $450,000 (includes $200,000 win bonus)
def. Randy Couture: $250,000

Kenny Florian: $80,000 ($40,000 win bonus)
def. Joe Stevenson: $35,000

Dustin Hazelett: $28,000 ($14,000 win bonus)
def. Tamdan McCrory: $10,000

Gabriel Gonzaga: $110,000 ($55,000 win bonus)
def. Josh Hendricks: $8,000

Demian Maia: $40,000 ($20,000 win bonus)
def. Nate Quarry: $25,000

Aaron Riley: $8,000 ($4,000 win bonus)
def. Jorge Gurgel: $10,000

Jeremy Stephens: $16,000 ($8,000 win bonus)
def. Rafael dos Anjos: $4,000

Mark Bocek: $18,000 ($9,000 win bonus)
def. Alvin Robinson: $7,000

Matt Brown $16,000 ($8,000 win bonus)
def. Ryan Thomas: $3,000

See also
 Ultimate Fighting Championship
 List of UFC champions
 List of UFC events
 2008 in UFC

References

External links
UFC 91 Event Site
UFC 91 Fight Card

Ultimate Fighting Championship events
2008 in mixed martial arts
Mixed martial arts in Las Vegas
2008 in sports in Nevada
MGM Grand Garden Arena